The Royal Children's Hospital (RCH) is a major children's hospital in Melbourne, Australia.

As a major specialist paediatric hospital in Victoria, the Royal Children's Hospital provides a full range of clinical services, tertiary care, as well as health promotion and prevention programs for children and young people.

The hospital is the designated statewide major trauma centre for paediatrics in Victoria and a Nationally Funded Centre for cardiac and liver transplantation.

Its campus partners are the Murdoch Children's Research Institute and The University of Melbourne Department of Paediatrics, which are based onsite at the hospital.

The hospital is surrounded by the parkland of Royal Park, with views of trees and much natural light.

History

The hospital was established in 1870 and moved to the corner of Flemington Road and Gatehouse Street in Parkville in 1963.

The Royal Children's Hospital was founded by Doctors John Singleton and William Smith, in response to their serious concerns about infant mortality in the fledgling city of Melbourne. The original "Free Hospital for Sick Children" was set up in a small house at 39 Stephen Street (now 49 Exhibition Street) and treated more than 1,000 children in its first year of operation.

In 2005, the Victoria State Government announced plans to build a brand new 340 bed home for RCH adjacent to the existing site. The winning bid of the redevelopment was led by Babcock & Brown with architects Billard Leece Partnership and Bates Smart Architects. HKS Inc. Architects of Dallas, Texas provided Pediatric Design and Planning Services and consulting engineers Norman Disney & Young. Work commenced on the site in late 2007, and was completed in late 2011, opened by Her Majesty Queen Elizabeth II on her Royal Tour. Patients were moved into the new hospital in November 2011. 

After the move to new facility, demolition of the old site was completed by December 2012. Much of the old site was turned back into parkland, creating a new gateway to Royal Park. Landscaping of the park was complete by 2015.

Good Friday Appeal
The Good Friday Appeal is held annually to raise money for the hospital. It has been broadcast on the Seven TV network for 52 years. 
The goal of the Appeal is to ensure that children with life-threatening illnesses receive the best possible medical and clinical care.

The 2009 Appeal raised $13,862,734. The 2010 Appeal raised $14,462,000. The 2011 Appeal raised $15,156,000. The 2012 Appeal raised  $15,820,640. The 2013 appeal raised $16,405,534.65. The 2016 Appeal, raised $17,445,624. The 2017 Appeal, raised $17,605,662.

A new record was set in 2018, with the appeal raising $18,043,251.

Centre for Adolescent Health, Gender Service
The RCH Centre for Adolescent Health, Gender Service provides a multidisciplinary approach to the assessment, care and treatment of gender dysphoria for children aged 3 to 17 years. In 2003 it received 1 referral, increasing to 7 referrals in 2007. In 2015 it was expected that there would be more than 150 referrals, with a one-year waiting list. The Andrews government said it will spend an extra $6 million over four years to reduce waiting times. During 2016 the gender clinic is expecting to receive at least 250 referrals.

Arms

See also 

List of hospitals in Australia
Healthcare in Australia

References

External links

Organisations based in Australia with royal patronage
Children's hospitals in Australia
Teaching hospitals in Australia
Hospitals in Melbourne
Hospitals established in 1870
1870 establishments in Australia
Hospital buildings completed in 2011
Buildings and structures in the City of Melbourne (LGA)